Indeloxazine (INN) (Elen, Noin) is an antidepressant and cerebral activator that was marketed in Japan and South Korea by Yamanouchi Pharmaceutical Co., Ltd for the treatment of psychiatric symptoms associated with cerebrovascular diseases, namely depression resulting from stroke, emotional disturbance, and avolition. It was marketed from 1988 to 1998, when it was removed from the market reportedly for lack of effectiveness.

Indeloxazine acts as a serotonin releasing agent, norepinephrine reuptake inhibitor, and NMDA receptor antagonist. It has been found to enhance acetylcholine release in the rat forebrain through activation of the 5-HT4 receptor via its action as a serotonin releasing agent. The drug has been found to possess nootropic, neuroprotective, anticonvulsant, and antidepressant-like effects in animal models.

References 

Abandoned drugs
Antidepressants
Indenes
Morpholines
NMDA receptor antagonists
Nootropics
Norepinephrine reuptake inhibitors
Phenol ethers
Serotonin releasing agents